Rui Ka Bojh (The Weight of Cotton) is a 1997 Hindi drama film directed by Subhash Agarwal, based on Chandra Kishore Jaiswal's novel Gawah Ghair Hazir with Pankaj Kapoor, Reema Lagoo and Raghubir Yadav in lead roles.

In 2013, to commemorate 100 years of Indian cinema, National Film Development Corporation of India (NFDC) released a digitally re-mastered print of the film under "Cinemas of India" label.

Plot
Kishan Shah, a self-respecting, wise old man who, divides his property amongst his family and decides to stay with his youngest son, Ram Sharan. But he is not able to get along with his son and daughter-in-law for long. Due to misunderstanding with the family he plans to  renounce his family and the world forever and  spend the rest of his life in a temple. But on the way to the temple he changes his mind and recalls the affection which his family gave to him and returns.

Cast
 Pankaj Kapoor as Kishan Shah
 Raghubir Yadav as Ram Sharan
 Reema Lagoo as Daughter-in-law
 Abha Parmar as younger Daughter-in-law

References

External links
 

1997 films
Indian drama films
1990s Hindi-language films
1997 drama films
Hindi-language drama films